Lü Tiancheng (15801618) was a Chinese playwright and poet active during the late Ming dynasty.

Career
Lü is widely believed to be the author of the erotic novel Xiuta yeshi or The Embroidered Couch, which he reportedly wrote as a teenager. According to his friend and a contemporary drama critic, Wang Jide, Lü also wrote another romantic novel titled Xianqing biezhuan "for fun". Having adapted several dramas including Romance of the Western Chamber and Story of a White Rabbit, Lü himself was also a drama critic. His seminal 1613 work Qu Pin or Opera Studies comprises some ninety biographies of playwrights, alongside commentaries on notable plays from the Yuan dynasty to the Ming dynasty; according to the Historical Dictionary of Chinese Theater, Qu Pin is "one of the most influential books on the variety opera, the Southern opera, the legend, and the Kun opera."

References

Citations

Bibliography

 
 

1580 births
1618 deaths
16th-century Chinese poets
17th-century Chinese writers